Livingstonville Community Church is a historic church at 1667 Hauverville Road in Livingstonville, Schoharie County, New York.  It is a rectangular, gable roofed, vernacular Greek Revival building built in 1849.  It features an engaged, clapboard sheathed bell tower surmounted by an open belfry.

It was listed on the National Register of Historic Places in 2008.

References

Churches on the National Register of Historic Places in New York (state)
Churches completed in 1849
19th-century churches in the United States
Churches in Schoharie County, New York
1849 establishments in New York (state)
National Register of Historic Places in Schoharie County, New York